Dana Sue Gray (born December 6, 1957) is an American serial killer who murdered three elderly women in 1994. She was caught after a fourth intended victim survived and identified her. Gray says she committed the murders to support her spending habits. She is serving her sentence in the California Women's Prison in Chowchilla.

Early life

Dana Sue Gray was born Dana Sue Armbrust on December 6, 1957, in southern California to Beverly (born Beverly Joyce Hetzel; 1929-1975) and Russell Armbrust. Russell worked as a hair dresser and had three previous marriages before marrying Beverly, a former beauty queen who had been an MGM starlet. They had several miscarriages before Dana was born. Beverly was described as an aggressive, vain woman.

They divorced when her husband found her grappling with an older woman who had angered her. Dana Sue was two years old at the time and afterwards rarely saw her father; she began acting out to get attention. Whenever Beverly would discipline her, Dana would retaliate by stealing money to buy candy and would occasionally fly into fits of violence. In school, she did not get along well with other students and did poorly in all her classes. She was suspended from school many times for forging notes to get out of class.

When Dana was 14, her mother developed breast cancer; Gray decided to become a nurse after watching hospital nurses treat her mother. After her mother's death in 1975, Gray moved in with her father but was forced to leave after her stepmother found drugs in her room. A few years later, she became involved with a skydiving instructor, who got her pregnant twice; he convinced her to terminate both pregnancies, something she resented. She later suffered several miscarriages, which led her into depression and psychotropic medications. She was fired from her nursing job after she was caught stealing drugs.

Personal life

Dana graduated from Newport Harbor High School in 1976. She lived with her sky-diving instructor, Rob, for the next several years and he helped her with nursing school.  She became an expert skydiver.  In 1981 she graduated from nursing school, and for the next few years had an on-again, off-again relationship with Chris Dodson, a windsurfer. Dana excelled in windsurfing and golf, and they took trips to Hawaii to participate in these activities.

In October 1987, Dana married a man named Tom Gray at an upscale winery in the Temecula area. He was a fellow sports enthusiast who had known and admired her since high school. Not long after their marriage, Dana incurred a large amount of debt.  At this time, she did not have much contact with her family due to a dispute over an aunt's will.

She was a labor and delivery nurse at Inland Valley Regional Medical Center. They lived in the gated community of Canyon Lake where they had several business ventures under the name Graymatter. Gray left her husband in early 1993 and moved in with their friend and her lover, Jim Wilkins, and his young son Jason.  In June, 1993, she filed for divorce from Gray, though this was not finalized until after Dana had been in jail for quite some time.

In September 1993, she and Gray filed for bankruptcy to stave off foreclosure on their Canyon Lake house.  Although the value of the house had greatly increased since they purchased it, they owed much more on the house than it was worth.  On November 24, 1993, she was fired from the hospital where she worked for misappropriating Demerol and other opiate painkillers.

On February 14, 1994, Dana sent word through Gray's parents (Gray kept his phone number and address hidden from her) that she wanted to meet with her estranged husband.  Gray initially agreed but did not show up.  Later that day, Dana murdered Norma Davis, an elderly lady whose home Dana had shared for a time.  Gray later found out that Dana had taken out an insurance policy on him.  The policy would have paid off the Canyon Lake house in the event of Gray's death.

Murder victims

Norma Davis

Norma Davis, 86, is thought to be Gray's first victim. Because of the lack of evidence Gray was never convicted of killing her. Davis was the mother-in-law of the woman (Jeri Davis) who married Gray's father, Russell Armbrust, in 1988. Jeri Davis' first husband, Bill Davis, was Norma Davis' son. Davis died in the early 1980s, and his widow eventually married Armbrust.

Jeri Davis continued to care for her elderly mother-in-law, even after she remarried.  Gray knew Norma Davis very well. On February 16, 1994, Davis had been dead for two days when she was found by her neighbor, Alice Williams. Davis had a wood handled utility knife sticking out of her neck, and a fillet knife sticking out of her chest. Other than a broken fingernail, she had no other marks. A bloodied afghan lay at her feet. Detectives learned that there was no forced entry into the house. 

Detectives were informed that she always kept her door locked unless she was expecting a visitor. Williams stated she could not remember Davis mentioning she was expecting company. Detectives found a Nike shoe print pointed toward the kitchen. They also found Davis' $148 Social Security check. On the first floor of Davis' condo, a smear of blood was found on an armchair. A ripped out phone cord was also found.

June Roberts
June Roberts, 66, was killed on February 28, 1994. Roberts, like Norma Davis, lived in the gated community of Canyon Lake. Gray had visited Roberts one day claiming she wanted to borrow a book about controlling a drinking problem. Roberts let Gray into her house. While Roberts searched for the book, Gray unplugged Roberts' phone, both the straight cord and the curly cord. She then used the curly cord to strangle Roberts. When Roberts was dead, Gray rifled through her credit cards, stealing two. An hour later, Gray went on a massive shopping spree at an upscale shopping center in Temecula.

Dora Beebe

On March 16, 1994, Gray killed Dora Beebe, 87. A few minutes after Beebe came home from a doctor's appointment, Gray pulled up in front of Beebe's house. Gray knocked on Beebe's door and asked Beebe for directions. Beebe invited Gray inside to look at a map. Once inside Gray attacked and killed Beebe. Beebe was found later that day by her boyfriend of eight years, Louis Dormand. An hour later, Gray used Beebe's credit card to go on a shopping spree.

Other victims

Dorinda Hawkins (1936-2003)
Gray attacked Hawkins on March 10, 1994 at her job at an antique store. Hawkins had been working alone that day. Gray came in to buy a picture frame for a photo of her deceased mother. Gray strangled Hawkins with a telephone cord. Gray took $5 from Hawkins' purse and $20 from the cash register. An hour later, Gray went on another shopping spree using Roberts' credit card. Hawkins had survived the assault, however, and was able to give detectives a description of Gray. The next day, the story was in the newspaper.

Effects of killings

Many of the residents of Canyon Lake were terrified. Some moved in with loved ones until the murders were solved. A group of elderly widows began sleeping in big groups at designated houses. They believed there was safety in numbers. A few residents theorised the murders were committed by a cult who engaged in ritual sacrifice.

Potential suspects

Detectives had problems finding suspects early on. At one point, it was so hard to find a lead that the supervisor in charge recommended using a psychic. Before Dana Gray became the lead suspect, detectives had few other suspects.

Jeri Armbrust
In the case of Norma Davis, detectives initially suspected Jeri Armbrust might be the killer. From talking to Armbrust, detectives learned she used to be married to Davis' son. After Norma Davis' son died, Jeri continued to care for her former mother-in-law. When Jeri remarried, it was to Russell Armbrust, Dana Gray's father. Hence, Dana's connection to Norma Davis. Davis was in very poor health and was still recovering from triple bypass surgery. Detectives also speculated that Jeri Armbrust had been in Davis' house the Sunday prior to the murder.

Jeri Armbrust claimed she only stopped by Davis' house to drop off groceries and heard Davis' TV on upstairs, but did not go up to say hello; she just left, and went home.  Detectives found it unusual for Jeri Armbrust to take care of someone who was not a blood relative, and she was wearing Nikes, and they also wondered why she would not have said hello to Davis.

After weeks of talking with Armbrust and building a rapport, Detective Joseph Greco, a lead investigator, realized she was not the person they were looking for. Greco and Jeri Armbrust became friends and began helping each other during the investigation. It was this relationship and trust which would be pivotal in solving this case.

Lead detectives

Joseph Greco

Detective Joseph Greco, of the Perris Police Department, led the investigations into the murders of Norma Davis and June Roberts. He graduated from the Riverside County Sheriff's Academy as a pre-service student and ranked among the top ten (#7) of his graduating class. He was hired out of the academy by the Perris Police Department in 1988. Greco was highly decorated for his tenacity in the field and received numerous awards to include the Medal of Valor for running into a plane to save victims of an accident at Perris Valley Airport on April 22, 1992.

Greco was promoted to the rank of Corporal in 1992 and assigned as an investigator working all major crimes against persons. The first victim, 87-year-old Norma Davis case, in 1994, was only Greco's second homicide investigation. Because of the seriousness of the crimes and his lack of experience, Greco initially questioned his ability to do an adequate investigation, but would eventually solve the case.   
Greco suspected that the Roberts and Davis case were connected due to evidence collected in the case and ultimately discovered it was the work of one female serial killer. He identified Dana Sue Gray as a potential suspect and wrote a search warrant for her residence in Lake Elsinore, California; Ironically, on the day she was out killing her last victim, Dora Beebe, Greco arrested Dana Sue Gray at her front porch and took her into custody for the murder of June Roberts.

The search of Gray's home revealed vital information belonging not only to Roberts, but also to Beebe and a surprise third victim, Dorinda Hawkins (1936-2003), the only woman who was not attacked at home, which may explain why she survived her attack, and who later positively identified Gray through a photo line-up.

Faced with a mountain of strong circumstantial evidence in the case against her, along with the threat of the death penalty, Gray would eventually plead to life without the possibility of parole and waived all of her appellate rights. She made one condition, that the State not prosecute her for the murder of Norma Davis.

Greco worked for the Riverside County's Sheriff's Department's Lake Elsinore Station specializing in elder abuse, sexual assault and child abuse cases from 1998 to 2010. He was later promoted to the rank of Sergeant in March 2010. 
   
Television documentaries involving Detective Greco include: The "Discovery Channel" for the following shows: "The New Detectives", Season 7, Episode 1, (New Dominion Pictures 2000), "Deadly Women" (Beyond Productions 2009)", Unusual Suspects" (LMNO Productions 2009) and "Forensic Factor 2" (Exploration Productions 2009).

Chris Antoniadas
Detective Chris Antoniadas was the lead detective on the Dora Beebe case. Antoniadas interviewed Gray after Detective Greco finished interviewing her.

Antoniadas had a knack for getting criminals to confess to their crimes during interrogation. He knew how to relate to people in order to gain their trust and have the person open up to him. Antoniadas also knew how to play someone's religion or insecurities against them. While interrogating Gray, Antoniadas had no clue how to approach her. Gray seemed cold and was unresponsive to any of Antoniadas's approaches.

Antoniadas finally decided he needed to take some of Dana's control away from her. He then interrogated her roughly, yelling at her to confess but was unsuccessful.

Seeing that did not work, Antoniadas charged her with the murder of Dora Bebee based upon the discovery of Beebe's credit cards found in Gray's sock drawer during Detective Greco's search warrant.

Case

Gray was finally caught because her description was obtained from various merchants in the Temecula, California area, where she used June Roberts' credit cards to go on a shopping spree. Dana had been spending so much money that the credit card company called June Roberts' family to alert them of the massive spending. The detectives then went to all the stores where Gray used the credit cards and interviewed the cashiers, getting a physical description of Gray. They also learned the killer had dyed her hair recently and had a little boy named Jason.

Detective Greco kept in touch with Jeri Armbrust. He began providing the description of the killer to her on a visit to her home. Jeri would reveal to Greco the next day that she believed the suspect to be her stepdaughter. Dana had just dyed her hair and had a son with her boyfriend named Jason. Detective Greco wrote a search warrant for Gray's home and enlisted the help of ARCNET (Allied Riverside County Narcotics Enforcement Team) to stake out Gray's home in Lake Elsinore.

Unbeknownst to the team, Gray was murdering Dora Beebe just hours before they began following her, trying to collect evidence. After seeing Dana go to the bank with Beebe's card and then go shopping, the detectives had enough information for nexus involving Dora Beebe's murder. Later that day (17 March 1994) Greco arrested Dana while she was cooking dinner for her family. Detective Greco took Dana into custody while assisting officers took her boyfriend and his son down to the station for questioning.

During questioning, Dana claimed she never took the credit cards. After detectives said they had evidence of her using them, Dana claimed she found both Roberts' and Beebe's cards. She stuck with this story for hours. She claimed the reason she kept the cards was she had an overwhelming need to shop. She also seemed to have no sympathy for the victims.

Detective Antoniadas attempted to obtain a confession after Detective Greco's interview but was unsuccessful. Detective Greco eventually booked Gray on charges of murder. At a hearing on July 23, Deputy DA Richard Bentley requested the death penalty. Gray pleaded insanity on all counts. After a witness claimed to have seen Gray at Roberts' house the day of her death, on 9 September 1998 Gray changed her plea to guilty of robbing and murdering two women and attempting to murder another. By pleading guilty Gray avoided the death penalty. On October 16, 1998, Dana Sue Gray was sentenced to life without parole and was incarcerated in the California Women's Prison in Chowchilla.

In media
The case was featured in a LMN (Lifetime Movie Network) 2015 episode of Diabolical Women. 

Gray's murder spree was also featured in a 2017 episode of It Takes A Killer on the television channel Escape. 

The case was also featured in Discovery Channel's series "The New Detectives" season 7 episode 1 which aired May 5, 2001. The case was also featured on Discovery Channel's series "Forensic Factor" episode 43 which aired on July 23, 2010.

See also 
 List of serial killers in the United States

References

External links
 State of California Inmate Locator DOC Number: W76776

1957 births
1994 murders in the United States
20th-century American criminals
American female serial killers
American people convicted of attempted murder
American people convicted of murder
American people convicted of robbery
American prisoners sentenced to life imprisonment
American serial killers
Criminals from California
Living people
Newport Harbor High School alumni
Nurses from California
People convicted of murder by California
People from Canyon Lake, California
Prisoners sentenced to life imprisonment by California
Violence against women in the United States